The marine sailfin silverside (Kalyptatherina helodes) is a species of sailfin silverside endemic to Indonesia, where it is only known from mangrove swamps around Misool and Batanta Islands.  This species grows to   total length.  It is the only known member of its genus.

References

Telmatherininae

Fish of Indonesia
Fish described in 1984